Medford Public Schools is a school district located in Medford, Massachusetts. The district has 9 schools in the city serving grades K-12. It is led by Superintendent Dr. Marice Edouard-Vincent. The main office is located at 489 Winthrop Street, within the High School/Vocational-Technical High School building.

Administration
Superintendent: Marice Edouard-Vincent
Assistant Superintendent, Director of Elementary Education/Title 1: Suzanne Galusi
Assistant Superintendent: Peter Cushing
Assistant Superintendent, Director of Finance and Administration: David Murphy

Elementary schools

Brooks Elementary School

Brooks Elementary School is located in the West Medford section of Medford, Massachusetts.  It is named for John Brooks, who was born in Medford, became a Revolutionary War veteran, and was later Governor of Massachusetts from 1816 to 1823.

Former Principals
 1994 - 2012 Michael Simon

Missituk Elementary School

Missituk Elementary School is located in the South Medford section of Medford, Massachusetts.  Since the student population historically has had a large (over fifty percent) portion qualifying for free and reduced lunch, the Missituk School instituted a universal free breakfast program beginning in late 2008.  Initial results included better attendance, fewer trips to the nurse and better student behavior.

Former Principals
 1988 - 1992 Mr.Donovon
1992-1994 Mr.Swanson

John J. McGlynn Elementary School

Named after a former mayor of Medford, the John J. McGlynn Elementary School shares a building and campus with the McGlynn Middle School on the eastern bank of the Mystic River, between Medford Square and Wellington Circle.  It is also immediately adjacent to the Andrews Middle School.

Milton Fuller Roberts Elementary School

The Milton Fuller Roberts Elementary School was named after Lt. Milton F. Roberts, a veteran of the Civil War, Spanish–American War, and World War I. Originally a junior high school or middle school, it opened in that capacity in 1928 in the Glenwood neighborhood of north east Medford.  It was converted into an elementary school in September 2003 as part of a series of school renovations across the district.

Secondary schools

Madeleine Dugger Andrews Middle School
Location: 3000 Mystic Valley Parkway, Medford, MA 02155
Coordinates:
Established: September 2000
Principal: Mr. Michael Downs
Assistant Principal: Julia McEwan
Staff: 72.3
Teaching Staff: 50.4
Grades: 6-8
Enrollment: 519 Students (2013-2014)
Grade 6: 158
Grade 7: 175
Grade 8: 176
Classes: 285
Student:teacher ratio: 10.3:1
MCAS % proficient and advanced: ELA: 68 ; Math: 47 ; Science: 41 (Spring 2014)
URL: https://andrews.mps02155.org/

Madeleine Dugger Andrews Middle School is named after the first African-American member of the Medford School Committee.  It was the first new school constructed in the district in eighty years.  Located on the eastern bank of the Mystic river, south of Medford Square, it is immediately adjacent to the McGlynn schools.

Fulton Heights Academy which is part of Andrews Middle School is dedicated to special needs children with social/emotional and behavioral/academic disabilities.

John J. McGlynn Middle School
Location: 3002 Mystic Valley Parkway, Medford, MA 02155
Coordinates:
Established: September 2004
Principal: Mr. Nick Tucci
Staff: 64.1
Teaching Staff: 46.6
Grades: 6-8
Enrollment: 531 Students (2013-2014)
Grade 6: 145
Grade 7: 192
Grade 8: 194
Classes: 263
Student:teacher ratio: 11.4:1
MCAS % proficient and advanced: ELA: 70 ; Math: 38 ; Science: 48 (Spring 2014)
URL: https://mcglynnms.mps02155.org/

Medford High School

Location: 489 Winthrop Street, Medford, MA 02155
Headmaster: Mr. Paul D'Alleva
Enrollment: 1,332 Students
URL: https://mhs-mvths.mps02155.org/

Medford Vocational-Technical High School
Location: 489 Winthrop Street, Medford, MA 02155
Director: Chad Fallon
Enrollment: 257 Students 
URL: https://mhs-mvths.mps02155.org/

Curtis/Tufts Alternative School
Location: 437 Main Street, Medford, MA 02155
Program Director: Brian Twomey
Staff: 8.8
Teaching Staff: 4.4
Grades: 9-12
Enrollment: 22 Students (2014-2015) 
Grade 9: 1
Grade 10: 6
Grade 11: 7
Grade 12: 7
Student:Teacher Ratio: 5:1
URL: https://curtistufts.mps02155.org/

References

External links
Medford Public Schools

School districts in Massachusetts
Medford, Massachusetts
Education in Middlesex County, Massachusetts